Death railway may refer to;
Burma Railway
Sumatra Railway
Salekhard–Igarka Railway
Death Railway (Spyforce Episode)